Helen Said This is an EP by The Dead C, released in 1989 by Siltbreeze. It has been compared to early Velvet Underground.

Track listing

Personnel 
Adapted from Helen Said This liner notes.
The Dead C
Michael Morley – instruments
Bruce Russell – instruments
Robbie Yeats – instruments

Release history

References

External links 
 Helen Said This/Bury at Discogs (list of releases)

1989 EPs
The Dead C albums
Flying Nun Records EPs